Beschermer (Protector) was a Dutch 56-gun fourth-rate ship of the line of the Admiralty of the Noorderkwartier (one of five provincial navies of the United Provinces of the Netherlands). The order to construct the ship was given by the Admiralty of the Noorderkwartier.

In 1795 she became part of the Batavian Navy, following the French invasion of the Netherlands.

On 11 October 1797 Beschermer took part in the Battle of Camperdown under Captain Dooitze Eelkes Hinxt. The ship escaped the battle after Hinxt was severely wounded.

On 30 August 1799 Beschermer, under Captain Eilbrach, was surrendered to the British during the Vlieter Incident. The Royal Navy then took her on in various subsidiary roles.

In 1801 Beschermer served as a guard ship in the Swin. She was fitted as a storeship in 1805. Beschermer was lent to the East India Dock Company for use as a hulk at Blackwall in 1806 until she was sold for breaking up in September 1838.

Beschermer was eventually broken up in 1838.

Citations

References

  

Ships of the line of the Dutch Republic
Ships of the line of the Batavian Republic
Ships of the line of the Royal Navy
Ships built in the Netherlands
1784 ships
Maritime incidents in 1797